The 2019–20 Hallyburton Johnstone Shield was a 50-over women's cricket competition, the third season with the name Hallyburton Johnstone Shield, that took place in New Zealand. It ran from November 2019 to March 2020, with 6 provincial teams taking part. Auckland Hearts beat Northern Spirit in the final to win the tournament.

The tournament ran alongside the 2019–20 Super Smash.

Competition format 
Teams played in a double round-robin in a group of six, therefore playing 10 matches overall. Matches were played using a one day format with 50 overs per side. The top two in the group advanced to the final.

The group worked on a points system with positions being based on the total points. Points were awarded as follows:

Win: 4 points 
Tie: 2 points 
Loss: 0 points.
Abandoned/No Result: 2 points.
Bonus Point: 1 point awarded for run rate in a match being 1.25x that of opponent.

Points table

Source: New Zealand Cricket

 Advanced to the Final

Final

Statistics

Most runs

Source: ESPN Cricinfo

Most wickets

Source: ESPN Cricinfo

References

External links
 Series home at ESPN Cricinfo

Hallyburton Johnstone Shield
2019–20 New Zealand cricket season
Hallyburton Johnstone Shield